Watford Town Hall is a municipal building in Rickmansworth Road, Watford, England. It is a Grade II listed building.

History
In the early 20th century Watford Urban District Council operated from municipal offices at Upton House in The Parade. The council sought a proper town hall after it achieved municipal borough status in 1922. The site proposed for the new building in Rickmansworth Road had previously been occupied by an old mansion known as "The Elms". The foundation stone for the new building was laid by Rigby Taylor, the Mayor, in 1938. The new building, which was designed by Charles Cowles-Voysey in the Neo-Georgian style, was completed in 1939. It was officially opened by the Countess of Clarendon on 5 January 1940. The design involved a concave main frontage of seven bays facing Rickmansworth Road from which wings stretched back to the south west and north west; the central section featured a doorway with a wide cast iron balcony and a shield above; there was a clock with a lantern above at roof level.

The facility also included a large public venue at the south west end of the complex initially known as "Watford Town Hall Assembly Rooms" but now referred to as the Watford Colosseum.

During the Second World War, William Joyce, who as Lord Haw-Haw broadcast Nazi propaganda from Germany to the UK, criticised Watford Borough Council for the fact that the town hall clock was always two minutes slow. Meanwhile British military forces carried out defensive exercises in case German invading forces ever stormed the town hall.

In 1971 the Watford Peace Memorial, which had originally been constructed outside the Peace Memorial Hospital, was moved to a location on the Parade just outside the building.

The town hall remains the headquarters of Watford Borough Council which, in August 2019, initiated a consultation on a rejuvenation plan which could see the area around the town hall being turned into a "cultural hub" and the town hall itself being converted into a hotel. The council indicated that, while the rest of the building might be redeveloped, the council chamber and committee rooms would be kept in their current use.

References

City and town halls in Hertfordshire
Grade II listed buildings in Hertfordshire
Government buildings completed in 1939